Collectors' Item: All Their Greatest Hits! is a compilation album released by Harold Melvin & the Blue Notes on the Philadelphia International record label in July 1976.  It includes all of their biggest hits with the label recorded between 1972 and 1975, such as "If You Don't Know Me by Now", "The Love I Lost", Bad Luck", and "Wake Up Everybody". Many of the songs were in extended versions. The album, produced by Gamble & Huff, sold over a million in the USA. The UK album release also included the track, "Satisfaction Guaranteed" which had been a big hit for the group there.

Track listing

Charts

References

External links
 

1976 compilation albums
Harold Melvin & the Blue Notes albums
Albums produced by Leon Huff
Albums produced by Kenneth Gamble
Albums recorded at Sigma Sound Studios
Philadelphia International Records compilation albums